Owen MacCarthy Reagh (1520–1594) was the 16th Prince of Carbery from 1576 to 1593. He belonged to the MacCarthy Reagh dynasty. Owen was commonly referred to as "Sir" Owen MacCarthy (McCartie) in the English court records.

Owen was the fourth son of Donal MacCarthy Reagh, 12th Prince of Carbery (r. 1505–1531) by his wife Lady Eleanor, daughter of Gerald FitzGerald, 8th Earl of Kildare, Owen became tánaiste in 1567, when his next elder brother Donogh MacCarthy Reagh, 15th Prince of Carbery (r. 1567–1576), father of Florence MacCarthy, succeeded their elder brother Cormac na Haoine MacCarthy Reagh, 13th Prince of Carbery (r. 1531–1567).

He was succeeded by the son of his brother Cormac na Haoine, Donal of the Pipes, 17th Prince of Carbery.

Career
Owen did not support Gerald FitzGerald, 15th Earl of Desmond during the Second Desmond Rebellion. Instead he allowed his forces of around 1200 fighting men to be employed by the Crown, and thus prevented much of the destruction that Carbery might have suffered if he had supported FitzGerald. He was accused of joining the rebellion in 1580, and may have given the appearance of it, but his friend Thomas Butler, the Earl of Ormond, prevailed upon him to cease whatever activity and convinced the government it was only local politics. MacCarthy Reagh's difficulties with the Crown's sub-sheriffs are suggested as the cause.

The total size of MacCarthy Reagh's forces is more difficult to determine. According to one count this included a peacetime 1,000 infantry and 30 knights, but according to another in 1588 his private forces greatly exceeded this, amounting to 60 horsemen, 80 professional soldiers, and 2,000 light infantry.

Owen also sat in the House of Lords of the Dublin Parliament of 1584–1585.

He was very influential in advancing the career of his nephew Florence, son of Donogh, at the expense of his nephew Donal of the Pipes, son of Cormac. Donal was his legal tánaiste but for some reason Owen favoured Florence, causing significant strife within the family, to be found discussed at length in the Life and Letters of Florence MacCarthy (see references). In 1592 Donal was finally able to oust the by then aged Owen, although leaving him a small estate and pension for his comfort until his death two years later in 1594.

Not long before, he earned the ire of the O'Mahony family when he tried to gain possession of one of their lordships after they had been dispossessed of it by the Crown government. MacCarthy Reagh was unsuccessful but it has been argued his efforts prevented the O'Mahonys from regaining the lordship themselves.

In or before 1592, the year he was deposed by his nephew Donal, MacCarthy Reagh was a witness in a lawsuit, along with his son-in-law Donal II O'Donovan, filed against them by O'Donovan's younger brother Teige, who alleged that his brother was a bastard who owed his entire position to Owen because of his marriage to his daughter Joanne, and that MacCarthy Reagh was himself an intruder, the lordship of Carbery supposedly belonging to his nephew Donal of the Pipes all along. The suit was filed by Teige in conjunction with the declaration of an intent by MacCarthy and O'Donovan to surrender clan lands for the purpose of obtaining a regrant (and which did not take place until 1608).   As the English court supported the concept of a grant and regrant, the suit by Teige was not successful, with Lord Chancellor Adam Loftus deciding Owen MacCarthy Reagh's was the rightful and legitimate MacCarthy Reagh.

Sons and descendants
Despite his being deposed by Donal in 1592, Owen's two sons Finghin and Donogh retained considerable lands and power, joining the side of Hugh O'Neill and allying with Spain in the Nine Years' War despite Donal remaining loyal to the English Crown. Often together with their brothers-in-law Donal II O'Donovan and Sir Fineen O'Driscoll (and his son Cornelius), the activities of "Sir Owen MacCartie's sons" were closely watched by Sir George Carew and his spies. Both received money and fully equipped troop companies from Philip III of Spain to supplement their own forces, and among their expeditions joined Donal Cam O'Sullivan Beare to support Pedro de Zubiaur at Castlehaven.

Through Finghin's son Callaghan, Owen became the ancestor of several lines of MacCarthy counts and viscounts in France, his male heirs finally dying out with the last Count MacCarthy de la Marlière in 1925.

Among Owen's surviving descendants today, in the female line, is The O'Donovan, through his daughter Joanne/Johanna.

Marriage and issue

Owen married Ellen O'Callaghan, daughter of Dermod O'Callaghan, Lord of Clonmeen, and they had issue:

 Finghin/Florence, Lord of Iniskean, who married Eleanor, daughter of Edmund FitzGibbon, the White Knight.
 Catherine, married Dermod MacCarthy Glas, 2nd son of Teige-an-Duna MacCarthy, Lord of Glean-na-Chroim
 Callaghan/Caragh, (allegedly) created Viscount of Timoleague by James I of England, but from whom descended the later Counts MacCarthy de la Marlière and other families of France
 Donogh Maol, who married Ne FitzGerald, daughter of Thomas Roe
 Ellen, who married Sir Fineen O'Driscoll
 Julia, who married Dermod O'Sullivan Mór, son of Donal O'Sullivan Mór
 Eleanor, who married Finin Mac Owen Carragh of Kilbrittain
 Johanna, who married Donal II O'Donovan, Lord of Clancahill
 Honoria, who married Edmund FitzGerald, Knight of the Valley (Knight of Glin)
 Graine, who married twice, 1) Barry Oge de Barry of Buttevant, 2) Cormac MacCarthy na Mona, son of Cormac Mac Teige MacCarthy of Muskerry

The ordering of Owen's daughters varies and in one source Johanna is given as the eldest.

Ancestry

Notes

References

 Calendar of the Carew Manuscripts. 1589–1600. 1601–1603. London.
 Calendar of the State Papers relating to Ireland in the reign of Elizabeth. Volume I. II. III. IV.
 Ellis, Peter Berresford, Erin's Blood Royal: The Gaelic Noble Dynasties of Ireland. Palgrave. Revised edition, 2002.
 MacCarthy Glas, Daniel, The Life and Letters of Florence MacCarthy. 1867.
 McCarthy, Samuel Trant, "The Clann Carthaigh (continued)", in Kerry Archaeological Magazine, Vol. 4, No. 19 (Oct. 1917), pp. 207–214
 McCarthy, Samuel Trant, The MacCarthys of Munster. 1922.
 O'Donovan, John (ed. & tr.), Annala Rioghachta Eireann. Annals of the Kingdom of Ireland by the Four Masters, from the Earliest Period to the Year 1616. 7 vols. Dublin: Royal Irish Academy. 1848–51. 2nd edition, 1856. Volume VI (Appendix, Pedigree of O'Donovan, pp. 2430–83).
 O'Donovan, John, and Duald Mac Firbis, The Genealogies, Tribes, and Customs of Hy-Fiachrach. Dublin: Irish Archaeological Society. 1844. pp. 444–450
 O'Hart, John, Irish Pedigrees. Dublin: James Duffy and Co. 5th edition, 1892.
 O'Mahony, John, "A History of the O'Mahony septs of Kinelmeky and Ivagha", in Journal of the Cork Historical and Archaeological Society, Volumes 12–16, Second Series. 1906–1910.
 Edmund Spenser, w/ Christopher Burlinson and Andred Zurcher (eds.), Selected Letters and Other Papers. OUP. 2009. Short Biography: Owen MacCarthy Reagh, pp. 251–2
 Stafford, Thomas, and Sir George Carew, Pacata Hibernia: or, A History of the Wars in Ireland, during the reign of Queen Elizabeth.Vol. I. Vol. 2. London. 1633. Edited w/ intro. & notes by Standish James O'Grady, Vol. II. London: Downey & Co. 1896.

MacCarthy dynasty
Irish lords
O'Donovan family
1520 births
1594 deaths
16th-century Irish people
People of the Second Desmond Rebellion